The 2012 WNBA Playoffs was the postseason for the Women's National Basketball Association's 2012 season. Four teams from each of the league's two conferences qualified for the playoffs, seeded 1 to 4 in a tournament bracket, with the two opening rounds in a best-of-three format, and the final in a best-of-five format.

The Minnesota Lynx qualified as the overall top seed, and the Los Angeles Sparks, San Antonio Silver Stars, and Seattle Storm also qualified in the West. The Connecticut Sun were the top seed in the East, joined by the Indiana Fever, Atlanta Dream, and New York Liberty.

Minnesota won the Western Conference championship, and Indiana won the Eastern Conference championship. The Fever won the 2013 WNBA Finals, winning three games to the Lynx's one.

Tiebreak procedures

Two-team tie
 Better record in head-to-head games.
 Better winning percentage within own conference.
 Better winning percentage against all teams with .500 or better record at the end of the season.
 Better point differential in games head-to-head.
 Coin toss.

Three or more-team tie
 Better winning percentage among all head-to-head games involving tied teams.
 Better winning percentage against teams within conference (for first two rounds of playoffs) or better record against teams in the opposite conference (for Finals).
 Better winning percentage against all teams with a .500 or better record at the end of the season.
 Better point differential in games involving tied teams.
 Coin toss.

Playoff qualifying

Eastern Conference

Western Conference

Playoffs and Finals

Eastern Conference

Conference semifinals

(1) Connecticut Sun vs. (4) New York Liberty

Regular-season series
Connecticut won the regular-season series 4–1:

(2) Indiana Fever vs. (3) Atlanta Dream

Regular-season series
Indiana won the regular season series 3–2:

Conference finals

(1) Connecticut Sun vs. (2) Indiana Fever

Regular-season series
The Connecticut Sun won 3–1 in the regular season series:

Western Conference

Conference semifinals

(2) Los Angeles Sparks vs. (3) San Antonio Silver Stars

Regular-season series
San Antonio won the regular-season series 3–1:

(1) Minnesota Lynx vs. (4) Seattle Storm

Regular-season series
Minnesota won the regular-season series 3–1:

Conference finals

(1) Minnesota Lynx vs. (2) Los Angeles Sparks

Regular-season series
The regular season series was tied 2–2:

WNBA Finals

Minnesota Lynx vs. Indiana Fever

Regular-season series
The Minnesota Lynx won the season series 2–0:

References

Playoffs
Women's National Basketball Association Playoffs